The Eicher Polaris Multix (or Multix) was a personal utility vehicle manufactured by Eicher Motors and Polaris India (the Indian arm of Polaris Inc.). The vehicle was announced in June 2015, and the first vehicle was delivered on 26 August 2015. Multix is promoted by its manufacturer as "India's first personal utility vehicle", able to be used as a people carrier, a cargo carrier and also a power generator.

History
In July 2012, Eicher Motors and Polaris Inc. formed a 50:50 joint venture (JV) to manufacture vehicles in India. Ltd." Thereafter, Eicher Motors and Polaris Industries combined their research and development facilities in their new manufacturing plant in Kukas, Jaipur, Rajasthan, India.

In May 2018, Eicher and Polaris announced they were closing down the Indian-joint venture, and discontinuing the Multix.

Design
The Multix was designed with the aim of being used for both family and business purposes, and has been called a "3-in-1" vehicle. Its cargo capacity is 400 litres. Multix also generates 3 kilowatts of electricity and can thus be used as a power generator as well.

Variants
The Multix has two variants, the AX+ and the MX. With the exception of doors (and the overall weight of the vehicle), both the variants are identical. AX+ has open doorways, whilst MX has doors. The curb weight of the MX is 100 kg more than that of AX+.

Availability
As of October 2015, 30 JV dealerships had been set up to sell Multix models, in Andhra Pradesh, Bihar, Gujarat, Maharashtra, Rajasthan, Tamil Nadu and Uttar Pradesh. Eicher Polaris Pvt. Ltd plans to have dealerships throughout India by mid-2017.

Four colors were available as of June 2015.

The first Multix vehicle was sold in August 2015, to Ganesh Narayan Choudhary. The company expects to sell 60,000 vehicles per year.

Financing
Eicher Polaris Pvt. Ltd has contracted with Cholamandalam Investment, and as of August 2015 was in negotiations with a number of other financial institutions, to provide financing to customers wanting to buy a Multix AX+ or MX.

Reception
As a new entrant in the Indian automotive market, the Eicher Motors-Polaris India partnership is expected to face challenges in establishing its brand. G. Balachandar of The Hindu referred to the Multix as able to convert from "a small car with space for family of 5 [to] a small truck with storage space" and said the innovative vehicle would "create its own segment of buyers." Another article in The Hindus "Business Line" praised the Multix's "smooth ride" and ability to "handl[e] rough terrain", and suggested it could "replace other mobility options" such as trucks, tractors and traditional automobiles. Santanu Choudhury, blogging for The Wall Street Journal, noted that the Multix was both small enough to give buyers the maneuverability needed for narrow or congested streets, and equipped to handle adverse road conditions including severe ruts and minor flooding. He also praised the possibilities opened up by the Multix's power generation capability, suggesting it could be used "to light up homes, power tools or even run a DJ console."

Specifications
Multix AX+
Seating capacity: 5 (including driver)
Displacement: 511 cm3
Max Engine power: 9.78 Bhp
Max Torque: 27.1 Nm @ 1,400 rpm
Wheel base: 2,005 mm
Length: 3,235 mm
Width: 1,585 mm
Height: 1,856 mm
Curb weight: 650 kg
Engine: Greaves four-stroke single-cylinder BS III
Fuel: Diesel
Ground clearance: 225 mm
Cargo capacity: 1,918 liters
Transmission: four-speed manual

See also
Eicher Motors
Polaris Inc.

External links
 Official page

References 

Minivans
Cars of India
Joint ventures
Cars introduced in 2015
Eicher Motors